Olive Birungi Lumonya, is a Ugandan businesswoman and corporate executive who serves as the deputy director general of the Uganda Civil Aviation Authority, effective 15 November 2021. Immediately before her current assignment, Birungi was the National Director of SOS Children's Villages Uganda, a non-government organization, that focuses on the needs of children.

Background and education
Birungi is a Ugandan national, born circa 1970. She attended local primary and secondary schools. She was admitted to Makerere University, the largest and oldest public university in the country. She graduated in 1994 with a Bachelor of Arts in Mass Communications degree.

She went on to obtain certification as a chartered marketer, recognized by The Chartered Institute of Marketing. Her degree of Master of Business Administration, was awarded by the Eastern and Southern African Management Institute. She also undertook a course "Market Driving Forces", at the London  Business School in 2013.

Career
Birungi started out as a newspaper reporter, reporting for the Weekly Topic Newspaper, (today the Daily Monitor). She then joined Nile Breweries Limited, working there for ten years, in different roles, including as brand manager, advertising executive, public relations officer and media manager.

In 2004, she left Nile Breweries and jointed Uganda National Social Security Fund (NSSF). She served there in various roles, including as public relations executive, marketing manager and head of marketing and communications. She spent 10 years as NSSF.

In 2014, she was appointed National Director of the SOS Children's Villages Uganda, an NGO. In November 2021, Birungi was appointed to a four-year term as the deputy director-general of the Uganda Civil Aviation Authority. She is based at the organization's headquarters in Entebbe.

Other considerations
At the time she was appointed as DDG of the Uganda CAA, Birungi was the chairperson of FINCA Uganda Limited. In the past, she was a board member of the Uganda CAA, from March 2014 until March 2020.

See also
 Shakila Rahim Lamar

References

External links
 Brief Profile
 Website of Uganda Civil Aviation Authority

Living people
1970 births
21st-century Ugandan businesswomen
21st-century Ugandan businesspeople
Makerere University alumni
Alumni of London Business School
Eastern and Southern African Management Institute alumni
Ugandan women chief executives